Podea is a kind of apron, that clearly designates a cloth hung at the foot of an icon in Orthodox Church, which often accompanies it in religious processions. This hanging often is embroidered with religious scenes or figures of the saints and liturgical writing. The image on a podea might either double or complement the subject of the icon: an epigram by Nicholas Kallikles describes a podea for the icon of the Theotokos at the Hodegon Monastery as “an image of the image”.

Embroidered  evolved into an essential supplement to the iconic image. It serves to create a sophisticated interaction with the icon, creating another level of perception of the icon; as such, it can serve to enrich, and/or develop on, the theme of the icon itself.

See also
Aër
Apron

References

 Frolov A. La «Podea»: un tissu décoratif de l’Eglise  // Byzantion, 1938. T. 13. Fasc. 2. P. 461—504.
 Woodfin W. T. Clothing the Icon: The Podea and Analogous Liturgical Textiles
 Petrov A. Podea: the Embroidery Image under the Icon and Its Function in Byzantine and Medieval Russian Churches // Proceedings of the 21st International Congress of Byzantine Studies. London, 21–26 August 2006. Vol. III. London, 2006. P. 311-312.

External links
 Ancient Russian Icon Podeas. XVth – XVIth centuries. Typology, Function, Iconography.  Ph.D. Dissertation (in Russian)

Eastern Orthodox icons
Sacramentals